Richard George Harris II (October 5, 1965 – December 26, 2016) was an American producer, actor, and comedian. He was known for his role as Malvo in the UPN/The CW sitcom Everybody Hates Chris.

Life and career
Harris played his first movie roles in Poetic Justice in 1993 and Murder Was the Case in 1994. He also had minor roles in Michael Mann's 1995 crime film Heat and Mikael Salomon's 1998 action movie Hard Rain.

Harris was the voice of DJ EZ Dicc, TaaDow, and Saul-T-Nutz from various skits featured on albums from Snoop Dogg to Tha Dogg Pound.

In 1993, Harris starred with Todd Hunter in the single episode of 357 Marina del Rey produced for the television series Danger Theatre, playing private detective Clay Gentry. From 1996 to 1998 he played the role of Javon "J. W." Willis in six episodes of the UPN situation comedy Moesha.

In the 2001 film Bones, Harris played alongside Snoop Dogg and Pam Grier.

In 2004, Harris lent his voice to various characters in the video game Grand Theft Auto: San Andreas. In 2007, he played the role of Cousin Fred in the film "This Christmas". From 2006 to 2008, Harris played Malvo, a recurring character in the sitcom Everybody Hates Chris.

In December 2016, Harris died from a heart attack. He had suffered a previous heart attack two years prior.

Filmography

Film

Television

Music Videos

Video Games

References

External links 

Ricky Harris at Find a Grave

1965 births
2016 deaths
American male comedians
Comedians from California
American male film actors
African-American male actors
American producers
American male television actors
21st-century American comedians
21st-century African-American people
20th-century African-American people
Burials at Forest Lawn Memorial Park (Long Beach)